Plessisville, Quebec is a county seat of L'Érable Regional County Municipality, Quebec, Canada. Routes 116 and 165 go through it. The city is 185 km from Montreal and 95 km from Quebec City.  Plessisville's claim to fame is as the "World's Maple Capital"; the city has hosted an annual Maple festival since 1958, and the Institut québécois de l'érable (Quebec Maple Institute) is headquartered there.  The production of maple syrup and maple products is a major industry in the entire area, even giving the regional county municipality its name (érable is French for "maple").

The first person to permanently settle in the area was Jean-Baptiste Lafond, in 1835.  First incorporated as the village of Somerset, the settlement was officially incorporated as the village of Plessisville in 1855 in honour of Monseigneur Octave Plessis, bishop of Quebec at the time.

Demographics 

Notable people
Denis Blondin, anthropologist
Pierre Bourque, saxophonist
Pierre-Andre Fournier, Roman Catholic Archbishop
Raymond Garneau, politician
Louis-Édouard Roberge, politician
François-Théodore Savoie, politician
Pierre Vachon, president of IB Quebec
Mavrik Bourque, hockey player

Sources
  Official City website
  Quebec Maple Institute
  Maple Festival

References

Cities and towns in Quebec
Incorporated places in Centre-du-Québec